Indus is a hamlet in southern Alberta, Canada under the jurisdiction of Rocky View County.

Indus is located approximately 6.1 km (3.8 mi) east of the City of Calgary's eastern limits and 24 km (15 mi) southeast of Downtown Calgary on Highway 791, 0.6 km (0.4 mi) north of Highway 22X.

Indus is home to a recreation complex that serves Rocky View County and the southeast communities in the Calgary region of which is made up of a mix which includes multi-generational Canadian farm families and acreage owners.

Indus's community hockey program is young, having been founded in the early 1970s, but in a relatively short time has developed a strong program that has seen many of its participating athletes move to advanced levels including junior hockey, Canadian university & USA college (NCAA), as well as professional hockey.

The name 'Indus' was suggested in 1914 to the Canadian Pacific Railway by Dr. J.M. Fulton, was the shortened version of "industry". When the rail line reached this area, Dr. Fulton envisioned industrial growth for the region.

Indus is also a Sanskrit word for "constellation of the stars". There appears to be no direct connection to the Sanskrit word.

Demographics 

The population of Indus according to the 2018 municipal census conducted by Rocky View County is 32, a decrease from its 2013 municipal census population count of 36.

Education 
Indus School provides education to students in kindergarten through grade 9.

See also 
List of communities in Alberta
List of hamlets in Alberta

References 

Karamitsanis, Aphrodite (1992). Place Names of Alberta – Volume II, Southern Alberta, University of Calgary Press, Calgary, Alberta. 
Read, Tracey (1983). Acres and Empires – A History of the Municipal District of Rocky View, Calgary, Alberta.

Calgary Region
Designated places in Alberta
Hamlets in Alberta
Rocky View County